Dresden Township may refer to the following places:

Dresden Township, Chickasaw County, Iowa
Dresden Township, Decatur County, Kansas 
Dresden Township, Kingman County, Kansas 
Dresden Township, Pettis County, Missouri
Dresden Township, Cavalier County, North Dakota
also South Dresden Township, Cavalier County, North Dakota

See also
Dresden (disambiguation)

Township name disambiguation pages